The ARC Centre of Excellence for Automated Decision-Making and Society (ADM+S) is a multi-institutional, multi-disciplinary research centre based at RMIT University in Melbourne, Australia. The Centre aims to contribute to the knowledge and strategies necessary for responsible, ethical and inclusive automated decision-making (ADM). It was established in 2020 with funding from the Australian Government through the Australian Research Council (ARC) and other partners. The Centre examines the social and technical  aspects of ADM, seeing automated systems as the outcomes of interactions between people, machines, data and institutions. It has a particular focus on the domains of news and media, transport and mobility, social services and health.

Projects and initiatives 
Research projects at the ADM+S Centre range across automated systems, from autonomous and semi-autonomous vehicles to the recommendation systems deployed in digital media. Researchers work on technologies from machine learning to blockchain. Projects are concerned with a wide spectrum of problems from digital inclusion to disinformation, addressing developments primarily in Australia and the Global South. Centre projects include:

Australian Search Experience project 
This research project is investigating if and how search results on Google differ for different people using a crowd-sourcing process recruited from Australian internet users. It follows on from a similar project run by Algorithm Watch in Germany in 2017. So far the results indicate search personalisation is limited however for some topics, such as COVID-19, there may be a high level of curation. The project will coincide with the next federal election in Australia and help to analyse whether search results have an impact on the information voters receive.

Considerate and Accurate Multi-party Recommender Systems for Constrained Resources 
This project aims to develop a next generation recommender system that enables equitable allocation of constrained resources. The project will produce novel hybrid socio-technical methods and resources to create a Considerate and Accurate REcommender System (CARES), evaluated with social science and behavioural economics lenses. CARES aims to transform the sharing economy by delivering systems and methods that improve user and non-user experiences, business efficiency, and corporate social responsibility.

The Automated Newsroom in Australia and beyond 
Automated decision-making (ADM) and related systems are now widely implemented in global newsrooms. These systems have substantial impacts on the nature and quality of journalistic output, on the shape of the newsroom workforce, and on audiences’ engagement with news content. This project investigates current developments in journalistic practice by conducting in-depth interviews with news workers, including journalists, social media editors, developers, programmers, computer scientists, graphic designers and social media marketing staff.

Automated decision-making and the law 
Centre researchers Dan Hunter, Kimberlee Weatherall are investigating the role of artificial intelligence, natural language processing and other technologies which are having a major impact on decision-making and administration across the legal system.

Funding and partners 
Total combined funding for the centre is A$71.1 million with the ARC providing funding of A$31.8 million over 7 years from 2020 until 2026. Centre partners include eight Australian universities and 22 organisations from around Australia, Europe, Asia and America. The Centre headquarters are located at RMIT University; the other Australian university partners are Monash University, Queensland University of Technology, Swinburne University of Technology, University of Melbourne, University of New South Wales, Western Sydney University, University of Sydney and University of Queensland.

Members 
Researchers in ADM+S include:
 Prof Julian Thomas, Centre Director
 Prof Jean Burgess, Centre Associate Director
 Prof Mark Andrejevic
 Prof Axel Bruns
 Prof Paul Henman
 Prof Heather Horst
 Prof Dan Hunter
 Prof Christopher Leckie
 Prof Deborah Lupton
 Prof Anthony McCosker
 Prof Christine Parker, University of Melbourne Law School
 Prof Sarah Pink, Monash University
 Prof Jason Potts
 Prof Megan Richardson, University of Melbourne
 Prof Mark Sanderson, RMIT University
 Prof Jackie Leach Scully
 Prof Nicolas Suzor, QUT
 Prof Kimberlee Weatherall, University of Sydney
Dr Jathan Sadowski, Monash University

References

External links 
ARC Centre of Excellence for Automated Decision-Making and Society (ADM+S)

Research organisations in Australia
Research institutes in Australia
2020 establishments in Australia